Brixia is a genus of Cixiid planthopper that includes about 120 species. Most species are found in the Oriental region, and a few in the Afrotropical realm.

Species

References

External links
 FLOW database

Auchenorrhyncha genera
Cixiidae